The 6th Ing Cup began on 30 April 2008 and concluded on 23 April 2009. Choi Cheol-han won the title, beating Lee Chang-ho 3–1 in the finals.

The main tournament featured 24 players:
China (10): Chang Hao, Gu Li, Hu Yaoyu, Kong Jie, Liu Xing, Peng Quan, Piao Wenyao, Wang Lei, Xie He, Zhou Heyang
Korea (6): Choi Cheol-han, Lee Chang-ho, Lee Sedol, Lee Younggu, Pak Yeong-hun, Song Tae Kon
Japan (4): Cho Chikun, O Meien, Takao Shinji, Yamashita Keigo
Taiwan (2): Cho U, Zhou Junxun
North America (1): Jiang Mingjiu
Europe (1): Catalin Taranu

Chang Hao, Lee Chang-ho, Kong Jie, Zhou Heyang, Choi Cheol-han, Song Tae Kon, O Meien, and Peng Quan were given first round byes.

Tournament

Finals

References

2008 in go
2009 in go
Ing Cup